Rab3 GTPase-activating protein non-catalytic subunit is an enzyme that in humans is encoded by the RAB3GAP2 gene.

Members of the RAB3 protein family (see RAB3A; MIM 179490) are implicated in Ca(2+)-dependent exocytosis. RAB3GAP, which is involved in regulation of RAB3 activity, is a heterodimeric complex consisting a 130-kD catalytic subunit (RAB3GAP1; MIM 602536) and a 150-kD noncatalytic subunit (RAB3GAP2) (Nagano et al., 1998).[supplied by OMIM]

References

Further reading